Amedework Walelegn (born March 11, 1999) is an Ethiopian long-distance runner. In 2016, he finished 4th in the 10,000m at the IAAF World U20 Championships in Bydgoszcz.

Walelegn finished 2nd and won the silver medal at the 2017 IAAF World Cross Country Championships in the Junior Men's race. He won the Istanbul Half Marathon in 2018, breaking the Istanbul Half record. In the same year, Walelegn finished 2nd in the New Delhi Half Marathon while also setting a new personal best at 59:22. At the 2020 World Athletics Half Marathon Championships, Walelegn finished 3rd and set a PB with a time of 59:08.

At the 2020 New Delhi Half Marathon, Walelegn won with a time of 58:53, breaking his own personal best and the course's record. It was also the 23rd fastest half marathon ever recorded at the time.

Personal Bests 
The following statistics are from the IAAF.
 5000m - 13:14.52 (2017)
 10,000m - 28:00.14 (2016)
 10K run - 27:37 (2018)
 Half Marathon - 58:53 (2020)

International Competitions

External links 
 Amedework Walelegn at IAAF

References

1999 births
Living people
Ethiopian male long-distance runners
20th-century Ethiopian people
21st-century Ethiopian people